This is a simplified family tree of all Frankish and French monarchs, from Childeric I to Napoleon III.

Merovingian Dynasty

Carolingian Dynasty

Capetian dynasty

House of Bonaparte

1: Chilperic II is most likely, but not certainly, son of Childeric II
2: Childeric III is son of either Chilperic II or Theuderic IV

See also
Family tree of French monarchs
Kingdom of France
List of French monarchs
List of French consorts
List of heirs to the French throne
 Legitimist claimants to the throne of France—descendants of the Bourbons, rejecting all heads of state since 1830. Unionists recognized the Orléanist claimant after 1883.
 Orléanist claimants to the throne of France—descendants of Louis-Phillippe, a cadet Bourbon, rejecting all heads of state since 1848.
 Bonapartist claimants to the throne of France—descendants of Napoleon I and his brothers, rejecting all heads of state 1815–48, and since 1870.
 Jacobite claimants to the throne of France—descendants of King Edward III of England and thus his claim to the French throne (renounced by Hanoverian King George III upon union with Ireland), also claiming Scotland, and Ireland.

Bibliography

Edward James, The Origins of France: Clovis to the Capetians 500-1000. .
Edward James, The Franks. Blackwell: 1991. .
The history of France as recounted in the Grandes Chroniques de France, and particularly in the personal copy produced for King Charles V between 1370 and 1380 that is the saga of the three great dynasties, the Merovingians, Carolingians, and the Capetian Rulers of France, that shaped the institutions and the frontiers of the realm. This work was commissioned at a time that France was embroiled in the Hundred Years' War with England, a war fought over hereditary claims to the throne of France. It must therefore be read with a careful eye toward biases meant to justify the Capetian claims of continuity and inheritance.
The Cambridge Illustrated History of France. Cambridge University Press.
Paul Fouracre and Richard A. Gerberding, Late Merovingian France: History and Hagiography, 640–720. Manchester University Press. .
Patrick Geary, Before France and Germany: The Creation and Transformation of the Merovingian World. Oxford: Oxford U. Press, 1988. .
Patrick Geary, The Myth of Nations: The Medieval Origins of Europe. Princeton University Press, 2001. .

Dynasty genealogy